The Clark Atlanta Panthers are the athletic teams that represent Clark Atlanta University, located in Atlanta, Georgia, in NCAA Division II intercollegiate sports. The  Panthers compete as members of the Southern Intercollegiate Athletic Conference for all ten varsity sports.

Varsity teams

List of teams

Men's sports
 Football

Women's sports
 Basketball
 Softball
 Tennis
 Track and field
 Volleyball

References

External links